Chen Hung-ling (born 10 February 1986) is a Taiwanese badminton player.

Chen Hung-ling is a doubles specialist. His best results have come with Cheng Wen-hsing in mixed doubles, but he routinely competes in men's doubles with Lin Yu-lang. In 2011 Chen and Cheng won the tournament at the Japan Super Series. They have reached the semi-finals of five other super series tournaments. He is known as the only player in the elite tournament that wears glasses while playing on the court.

They appeared at the 2012 Summer Olympics, but did not qualify from their group.

Achievements

BWF World Championships
Men's doubles

Asian Games
Mixed doubles

Asian Championships
Men's doubles

East Asian Games
Men's doubles

Mixed doubles

Summer Universiade
Mixed doubles

BWF World Tour (2 titles)
The BWF World Tour, which was announced on 19 March 2017 and implemented in 2018, is a series of elite badminton tournaments sanctioned by the Badminton World Federation (BWF). The BWF World Tour is divided into levels of World Tour Finals, Super 1000, Super 750, Super 500, Super 300 (part of the HSBC World Tour), and the BWF Tour Super 100.

Men's doubles

BWF Superseries (2 titles, 1 runner-up)
The BWF Superseries, which was launched on 14 December 2006 and implemented in 2007, was a series of elite badminton tournaments, sanctioned by the Badminton World Federation (BWF). BWF Superseries levels were Superseries and Superseries Premier. A season of Superseries consisted of twelve tournaments around the world that had been introduced since 2011. Successful players were invited to the Superseries Finals, which were held at the end of each year.

Mixed doubles

  Superseries Premier Tournament
  Superseries Tournament

BWF Grand Prix (7 titles, 10 runners-up)
The BWF Grand Prix had two levels, the Grand Prix and Grand Prix Gold. It was a series of badminton tournaments sanctioned by the Badminton World Federation (BWF) and played between 2007 and 2017.

Men's doubles

Mixed doubles

  BWF Grand Prix Gold tournament
  BWF Grand Prix tournament

BWF International Challenge/Series (7 winners, 2 runners-up)
Men's doubles

Mixed doubles

  BWF International Challenge tournament
  BWF International Series tournament
  BWF Future Series tournament

Record Against Selected Opponents
Mixed doubles results with Cheng Wen-hsing against Super Series finalists, World Championships semifinalists, and Olympic quarterfinalists.

  Zheng Bo & Ma Jin 1–0
  Tao Jiaming & Tian Qing 0–2
  Zhang Nan & Zhao Yunlei 1–7
  Xu Chen & Ma Jin 0–1
  Lee Sheng-mu & Chien Yu-chin 1–1
  Joachim Fischer Nielsen & Christinna Pedersen 3–3
  Thomas Laybourn & Kamilla Rytter Juhl 1–0
 / Chris Adcock & Imogen Bankier 0–1
  Chris Adcock & Gabby Adcock 1–0
  Michael Fuchs & Birgit Michels 1–2
  Tantowi Ahmad & Liliyana Natsir 0–5
  Fran Kurniawan & Pia Zebadiah Bernadet 3–0
  Nova Widianto & Liliyana Natsir 0–1
  Ko Sung-hyun & Kim Ha-na 1–2
  Chan Peng Soon & Goh Liu Ying 5–1
  Robert Mateusiak & Nadieżda Zięba 5–0
  Sudket Prapakamol & Saralee Thungthongkam 3–3

References

External links

1986 births
Living people
Sportspeople from Taipei
Taiwanese male badminton players
Badminton players at the 2012 Summer Olympics
Olympic badminton players of Taiwan
Badminton players at the 2010 Asian Games
Badminton players at the 2014 Asian Games
Badminton players at the 2018 Asian Games
Asian Games bronze medalists for Chinese Taipei
Asian Games medalists in badminton
Medalists at the 2010 Asian Games
Medalists at the 2014 Asian Games
Medalists at the 2018 Asian Games
Universiade bronze medalists for Chinese Taipei
Universiade medalists in badminton
Medalists at the 2013 Summer Universiade